The Li Mei-shu Memorial Gallery is a memorial gallery located in Sanxia District, New Taipei, Taiwan. The gallery is dedicated to Taiwanese painter, sculptor and politician Li Mei-shu.

History
The gallery was opened on 9 April 1995 by descendants of Li.

Exhibitions
The gallery exhibits various artwork collections and documents of Li.

See also
 List of tourist attractions in Taiwan

References

External links

 
 YouTube - Li Mei-shu Memorial Gallery Introduction video

1995 establishments in Taiwan
Buildings and structures in New Taipei
Tourist attractions in New Taipei